Following is a list of senators of Jura, people who have represented the department of Jura in the Senate of France.

Third Republic

Senators for Jura under the French Third Republic were:

 François Tamisier (1876-18809)
 Jules Thurel (1876-1897)
 Paul Grévy (1880–1906)
 Adolphe Lelièvre (1888–1897)(1897–1906)
 Jean-Baptiste Bourgeois du Jura (1897)
 Jean-Baptiste Vuillod (1897–1906)
 Stephen Pichon (1906–1924)
 Antoine Mollard (1906–1920)
 Georges Trouillot (1906–1920)
 Victor Bérard (1920–1932)
 Maximin Brocard (1920–1933)
 Marius Pieyre (1932–1935)
 Charles Dumont (1924–1939)
 Adrien Berthod (1935–1940)
 Charles Cencelme (1933–1937)
 Henri Léculier (1937–1940)
 Adolphe Pointaire (1939–1940)

Fourth Republic

Senators for Jura under the French Fourth Republic were:

 Charles Laurent-Thouverey, Gauche démocratique, (1946–1958)
 Paul Giauque, Popular Republican Movement, (1946–1955)
 Paul Seguin, Radical-socialiste, (1955–1958)

Fifth Republic 
Senators for Jura under the French Fifth Republic:

References

Sources

 
Lists of members of the Senate (France) by department